Hoff is a hamlet and civil parish in the Eden district of the county of Cumbria, England. At the 2001 census the parish had a population of 189, decreasing marginally to 164 at the 2011 Census.

Hoff consists of a number of houses, pub, The New Inn, which re-opened in 2011 after a number of years of closure; a postbox; and, formerly, a pioneering solar-powered lamppost.  The name Hoff originates from old Norse and means 'a heathen sanctuary or temple'.

See also

Listed buildings in Hoff, Cumbria

References

External links
 Cumbria County History Trust: Hoff (nb: provisional research only – see Talk page)

Hamlets in Cumbria
Civil parishes in Cumbria